Alan F. Harre (1940–2020) was the seventeenth president of Valparaiso University, a post he held for 20 years from 1988 to 2008. He was succeeded by Elizabethtown College alumnus, Mark A. Heckler. Harre was designated President Emeritus of Valparaiso University on July 1, 2008, and was voted one of Valparaiso University's 150 most influential people in history by 2009. He was also the sixth president of Concordia University, St. Paul, from 1984 to 1988.

Early life and education
Alan Frederick Harre was born on June 12, 1940, in Nashville, Illinois, to Adolph and Hilda Harre. He  attended St. Paul's College in Concordia, Missouri and graduated in 1960. He received his bachelor's of arts degree in 1962 from Concordia College in Fort Wayne, Indiana. He received his master of divinity degree in 1966 from Concordia Seminary in Clayton, Missouri. In 1967, he received a master's of arts degree from the Presbyterian School of Christian Education in Richmond, Virginia. He then attended Wayne State University.

Works

Thesis

Books

References

External links

1940 births
2020 deaths
Wayne State University alumni
20th-century American Lutheran clergy
Presidents of Valparaiso University
Concordia Seminary alumni
21st-century American Lutheran clergy